Resupinatus applicatus, commonly known as the smoked oysterling or the black jelly oyster, is a species of fungus in the family Tricholomataceae, and the type species of the genus Resupinatus. First described in 1786 as Agaricus applicatus by August Johann Georg Karl Batsch, it was transferred to Resupinatus by Samuel Frederick Gray in 1821.

Description
The dry cap surface is covered with small, fine hairs. The mushrooms have no stem, and have a firm but gelatinous flesh. The mushrooms produce a white spore print.

Habitat and distribution
The fungus is saprobic, and grows on decaying wood. It is widely distributed in North America, Europe, and Australia.

References

External links

Tricholomataceae
Fungi of Australia
Fungi of North America
Fungi of Europe
Taxa named by August Batsch